Zhongcang Subdistrict is a subdistrict and the seat of Tongzhou District, Beijing. It borders Xinhua Subdistrict to its north, Tongyun Subdistrict to its east, Yuqian Subdistrict to its south, and Beiyuan Subdistrict to its west. As of 2020, it had 66,903 people residing under its administration.

During the Ming and Qing dynasties, this region had an imperial granary for keeping foods transported through the Grand Canal, and as a result the region began to be known as Zhongcang.

History 
In December of 1948, four townships of Tongxian were separated and merged to form Tongzhou City. It was then changed to a county-administered town in 1950. In 1997, Tongzhou Town was dissolved, and the former Dongcheng and Nancheng Subdistricts were combined to form Zhongcang Subdistrict.

Administrative divisions 

In 2021, the subdistrict was made up of 13 residential communities:

Gallery

See also
List of township-level divisions of Beijing

References

Tongzhou District, Beijing
Subdistricts of Beijing